My Gal Sal is a 1942 American musical film distributed by 20th Century Fox and starring Rita Hayworth and Victor Mature. The film is a biopic of 1890s composer and songwriter Paul Dresser and singer Sally Elliot. It was based on a biographical essay, sometimes erroneously referred to as a book, by Dresser's younger brother, novelist Theodore Dreiser (Dreiser was the original family name). Some of the songs portrayed as Dresser's work were actually written by him, but several were created for the film by the Hollywood songwriting team of Ralph Rainger and Leo Robin.

Sally Elliott, a musical star meets up with Indiana boy Paul Dresser, a runaway who after a brief stopover with a medicine show arrives in Gay Nineties New York. He composes the title tune for the fair lady and becomes the toast of Tin Pan Alley.

Plot Summary
Indiana boy Paul Dresser (Victor Mature) runs away from home to become a musician against the wishes of his strict father who is determined Paul will become a minister instead. After being run out of town and left for dead for mistakenly being associated with a conman, he is found by Colonel Truckee - a travelling snake oil salesman - and his medicine show.

There, he meets Mae Collins (Carole Landis), who encourages him to join them. During one of his performance, Sally Elliot (Rita Hayworth) laughs at Paul which offends him, and her companion, Fred Haviland (John Sutton) gives him two tickets to her show, which Paul and Mae attend. However, they are kicked out for being too boisterous. Paul decides that night that he's leaving the medicine show for good and bids Mae goodbye.

Upon his return to New York, he overhears a man playing piano and finds out that Sally has stolen the song he played at the medicine show but added her own lyrics. Paul decides to hire the man he overheard playing the piano (James Gleason) as his publisher and joins him in reclaiming his rights over the song. Paul ends up becoming Sally's personal songwriter for her shows.

Paul begins falling for her, despite her engagement to Fred. After writing songs in Sally's apartment the day following the party to celebrate the success of 'Come Tell Me Whats Your Answer (Yes or No)''' - the two kiss. From there they achieve success after success. When Paul shows up late to one of many celebration parties with the Countess Mariana Rossini (Mona Maris), Sally blows up at Paul and gives him the cold shoulder. Following more petty quarrelling, he proposes marriage to Sally and she accepts.

That night, Paul returns to his apartment and finds the Countess' husband has challenged him to a duel. Enraged at the idea of it alone, Paul storms over to the Countess' home to confront the Count - only to find it was all a ploy by the Countess to see him again. Sally witnesses him returning from the Countess' party and assumes the worst. She breaks their engagement and refuses to sing his music ever again, until Paul sends a man with a song dedicated to her under a pen name which she performs with great success. When he reveals that he was the one who wrote it - after much bickering - the two decide to reconcile.

Cast
 Rita Hayworth as Sally Elliott (singing voice was dubbed by Nan Wynn)
 Victor Mature as Paul Dresser (singing voice was dubbed by Ben Gage)
 John Sutton as Fred Haviland
 Carole Landis as Mae Collins
 James Gleason as Pat Hawley
 Phil Silvers as Wiley
 Walter Catlett as Col. Truckee
 Mona Maris as Countess Mariana Rossini
 Frank Orth as McGuinness
 Stanley Andrews as Mr. Dreiser
 Margaret Moffatt as Mrs. Dreiser 
 Terry Moore as Carrie Dreiser
 Libby Taylor as Ida, Sally's Maid
 John Kelly as John L. Sullivan
 Iron Eyes Cody as Indian (uncredited) 
 George Melford as Conductor (uncredited)
Choreographer Hermes Pan appears as Hayworth's dance partner in the "Gay White Way" number.

Awards
The film won the Academy Award for Best Art Direction, Color (Richard Day, Joseph C. Wright and Thomas Little). It also was nominated for Academy Award for Best Scoring of a Musical Picture (Alfred Newman).

Production
20th Century Fox head Darryl F. Zanuck purchased the story of My Gal Sal from Theodore Dreiser for $50,000 in the summer of 1942. Zanuck initially had the script and the lead role of Sally Elliott tailor-made to fit the talents of Fox's biggest female star at the time, Alice Faye. Faye was going to star with Carole Landis, George Montgomery, and John Shepperd.

However, Faye stated that she was tired of starring in costume musicals and turned the film down. Afterward, the part was offered to Betty Grable, who was becoming known as a successor to Faye at Fox, but who turned it down, believing Fox was over-working her.

Zanuck thereafter had the script rewritten and redirected to showcase Irene Dunne, but her busy film schedule meant holding up production on My Gal Sal for eighteen months. Zanuck subsequently approached Mae West with the role, but she too turned it down. Zanuck considered grooming newcomer Carole Landis for the part, but her screen test failed to impress the producers. Despite not winning the part of Sally Elliott, Landis did end up playing the secondary lead of Mae Collins in the film, because she had already been publicized as appearing in the film.

Zanuck finally approached Harry Cohn, head of Columbia Pictures, about borrowing Rita Hayworth for the film. Zanuck had been impressed with Hayworth's performance in the 1941 film version of Blood and Sand, also for Fox. Cohn, on the other hand, was hoping to buy My Gal Sal from Fox and cast Hayworth in the part upon the film's transfer to Columbia. Zanuck, however, rebuffed at selling the film, but instead offered Hayworth an exclusive two-movie contract to star in My Gal Sal and Tales of Manhattan (1942). Cohn eventually agreed to loan Hayworth to Fox for both movies.

Victor Mature's role was originally meant to be played by Don Ameche.

ReceptionMy Gal Sal received positive reviews upon its 1942 release.Daily Variety said the film was a very "lively, merry musical treat. A pricture crammed with color, songs, and movement, carrying broad appeal for all theatergoers, both young and old." Hayworth was proclaimed to have done a "beautiful job" as Sally, while Victor Mature turned out an "impressing performance" as Dresser.Life stated: My Gal Sal'' hits a current demand, both in the movies and in radio, for the nostalgic delights of the 1890s."

The film went on to become one of the most-successful Fox films during 1942.

Some of Rita Hayworth's lines were sampled in the Pet Shop Boys 1996 track "Electricity." The film happened to be playing on television while the track was being recorded, and was not publicly identified until 2019.

References

External links
 
 
 
 Soundtrack Information

1942 films
1940s biographical films
1942 musical films
20th Century Fox films
American biographical films
American musical films
Biographical films about musicians
1940s English-language films
Films about composers
Films directed by Irving Cummings
Films scored by Leigh Harline
Films set in the 1890s
Films whose art director won the Best Art Direction Academy Award
Musical films based on actual events
Cultural depictions of classical musicians
1940s American films